Nuevo México may refer to:

Santa Fe de Nuevo México, a Kingdom of the Spanish Empire and New Spain, later a territory of Mexico
New Mexico Territory, an organized incorporated territory of the United States 1850–1912
New Mexico, a U.S. state
Nuevo México, Chiapas, a locality in Villaflores, Chiapas, Mexico
Nuevo México, Jalisco, Mexico
Nuevo México, Chiriquí, Panama

See also
"A Nuevo México", the New Mexico state poem